The 2009 Meath Senior Football Championship was the 117th edition of the Meath GAA's premier club Gaelic football tournament for senior graded teams in County Meath, Ireland. The tournament consists of 16 teams, with the winner going on to represent Meath in the Leinster Senior Club Football Championship. The championship starts with a group stage and then progresses to a knock out stage.
 
Navan O'Mahonys were the defending champions after they defeated Summerhillin the previous years final.

St. Ultan's were promoted after claiming the 2008 Meath Intermediate Football Championship title, their first ever year in the senior grade.

On 26 September 2009, Seneschalstown claimed their 4th Senior Championship title when they defeated Wolfe Tones 2-8 to 1-8 after a replay. Ciaran Macken lifted the Keegan Cup for the Yellow Furze outfit while Damien Sheridan claimed the 'Man of the Match' award.

After much controversy no team was relegated from the senior grade. Walterstown lost their relegation tie after extra time to Rathkenny, but appealed for a re-fixture on the basis that extra time wasn't agreed beforehand. When Rathkenny refused to fulfill a re-fixture no team was relegated and the Intermediate Champions Oldcastle became the 17th team in the Senior Football Championship.

Team changes
The following teams have changed division since the 2008 championship season.

To S.F.C.
Promoted from I.F.C.
 St. Ultan's  -  (Intermediate Champions)

From S.F.C.
Relegated to I.F.C.
 Kilmainhamwood

Participating teams
The teams taking part in the 2009 Meath Senior Football Championship are:

Group stage
There are 3 groups called Group A, B and C. The 3 top finishers in Group A and the top 2 finishers in Group B and C will qualify for the quarter finals. Third place in Group B will play third place in Group C for a quarter finals place. The 3 teams that finish last in their groups will play in a round-robin relegation play off. Dunshaughlin defeated Blackhall Gaels in the preliminary quarter finals to qualify in 2009.

Group A

Round 1:
 Seneschalstown 0-11, 0-9 Navan O'Mahony's, Pairc Tailteann, 19/4/2009,
 Duleek/Bellewstown 1-9, 0-8 Donaghmore/Ashbourne, Pilltown, 19/4/2009,
 Simonstown Gaels 1-16, 1-8 St. Patrick's, Pairc Tailteann, 19/8/2009,

Round 2:
 Navan O'Mahony's 0-14, 0-7 Donaghmore/Ashbourne, Skryne, 3/5/2009,
 St. Patrick's 1-10, 1-8 Seneschalstown, Ashbourne, 1/5/2009,
Simonstown Gaels 5-11, 1-9 Duleek/Bellewstown, Pairc Tailteann, 3/5/2009,

Round 3:
 Navan O'Mahonys 1-12, 0-8 Duleek/Bellewstown, Seneschalstown, 14/6/2009,
 St. Patrick's 2-13, 1-13 Donaghmore/Ashbourne, Donore, 17/6/2009,
 Simonstown Gaels 1-15, 1-15 Seneschalstown, Pairc Tailteann, 17/6/2009,

Round 4:
 Navan O'Mahony's 2-12, 0-8 Simonstown Gaels, Pairc Tailteann, 13/9/2009,
 St. Patrick's 0-10, 0-10 Duleek/Bellewstown, Ashbourne, 13/9/2009,
 Donaghmore/Ashbourne 1-7, 1-6 Seneschalstown, Ratoath, 13/9/2009,

Round 5:
 Donaghmore/Ashbourne 1-11, 0-8 Simonstown Gaels, Skryne, 19/9/2009,
 St. Patrick's 0-11, 0-11 Navan O'Mahonys, Donore, 20/9/2009,
 Seneschalstown 2-15, 0-13 Duleek/Bellewstown, Pairc Tailteann,  20/9/2009,

Group B

Round 1:
 Blackhall Gaels 1-12, 1-10 St. Ultan's, Walterstown, 19/4/2009,
 Skryne 0-19, 1-8 St. Peter's Dunboyne, Dunshaughlin, 19/4/2009,
 Walterstown  -  Bye

Round 2:
 Skryne 2-10, 0-10 Walterstown, Pairc Tailteann, 3/5/2009,
 St. Ultan's 1-10, 2-7 St. Peter's Dunboyne, Seneschalstown, 3/5/2009,
 Blackhall Gaels  -  Bye

Round 3:
 Blackhall Gaels 1-9, 0-10 Walterstown, Dunshaughlin, 7/6/2009,
 Skryne 0-15, 1-8 St. Ultan's, Pairc Tailteann, 7/6/2009,
 St. Peter's Dunboyne  -  Bye

Round 4:
 Skryne 0-11, 1-6 Blackhall Gaels, Dunshaughlin, 5/9/2009,
 St. Peter's Dunboyne 1-12, 0-12 Walterstown, Pairc Tailteann, 6/9/2009,
 St. Ultan's  -  Bye
 
Round 5:
 St. Peter's Dunboyne 2-11, 0-7 Blackhall Gaels, Ashbourne, 18/9/2009,
 St. Ultan's 2-15, 0-11 Walterstown, Pairc Tailteann, 20/9/2009,
 Skryne  -  Bye

Group C

Round 1:
 Trim 0-16, 0-5 Rathkenny, Simonstown, 18/4/2009,
 Summerhill 0-11, 0-7 Dunshaughlin, Dunsany, 19/4/2009,
 Wolfe Tones  -  Bye

Round 2:
 Dunshaughlin 2-12, 2-4 Rathkenny, Simonstown, 3/5/2009,
 Wolfe Tones 1-12, 0-13 Trim, Pairc Tailteann, 4/5/2009,
 Summerhill  -  Bye

Round 3:
 Wolfe Tones 1-12, 1-9 Summerhill, Athboy, 14/6/2009,
 Dunshaughlin 1-15, 2-11 Trim, Pairc Tailteann, 14/6/2009,
 Rathkenny  -  Bye

Round 4:
 Wolfe Tones 0-15, 0-5 Rathkenny, Pairc Tailteann, 13/9/2009,
 Summerhill 2-10, 3-5 Trim, Pairc Tailteann, 13/9/2009,
 Dunshaughlin  -  Bye

Round 5:
 Wolfe Tones 2-12, 0-11 Dunshaughlin, Pairc Tailteann, 19/9/2009,
 Summerhill 1-14, 0-8 Rathkenny, Simonstown, 19/9/2009,
 Trim  -  Bye

Knock-out Stages

Relegation Play Off

In the relegation match between Rathkenny and Walterstown, Rathkenny won the original match (1-13 to 0-13 AET in Seneschalstown), but Walterstown appealed the result on the basis that the playing of extra-time had not been agreed beforehand. The Leinster Council ruled in their favour at a subsequent appeal, throwing the championship into chaos. Rathkenny wouldn't fulfill a re-fixture so that meant no teams were relegated in 2009, but instead an extra team was added to the Senior Football Championship, bringing the total number of teams from 16 to 17.

Finals

Preliminary Quarter-Finals
 Dunshaughlin 1-12, 1-4 Blackhall Gaels, Ashbourne, 25/9/2009,

Quarter-Finals
 Wolfe Tones 1-18, 0-9  St Peters Dunboyne, Pairc Tailteann, 24/9/2009,
 Skryne 1-10, 2-15 Seneschalstown, Pairc Tailteann, 27/9/2009,
  St Patricks 0-11, 1-11 Summerhill, Pairc Tailteann, 27/9/2009,
 Navan O'Mahonys 2-12 ,2-6 Dunshaughlin, Pairc Tailteann, 4/10/2009,

Semi-Finals
 Wolfe Tones 0-14, 0-14 Navan O'Mahonys, Pairc Tailteann, 11/10/2009, AET 
 Seneschalstown 0-14 , 1-10 Summerhill, Pairc Tailteann, 11/10/2009,
 Wolfe Tones 0-11, 0-8 Navan O'Mahonys, Pairc Tailteann, 18/10/2009 

Final
 Wolfe Tones 1-13, 1-13 Seneschalstown, Pairc Tailteann, 1/11/2009, AET 

Final Replay
 Wolfe Tones 1-8, 2-8 Seneschalstown, Pairc Tailteann, 5/11/2009,

References
Rathkenny still waiting – Sport – GAA – Articles – Meath Chronicle
Senior Football Championship
Schedule takes heavy toll – Sport – Roundup – Articles – Meath Chronicle
Seneschalstown prevail – Sport – Matchreports – Articles – Meath Chronicle 

Meath Senior Football Championship
Meath Senior Football Championship